Aksel Aktaş (born 15 July 1999) is a footballer who plays as a midfielder for Turkish club Gençlerbirliği. Born in France, he represented both that nation and Turkey at youth international level.

Professional career
A member of the Sochaux academy since 2007, Aktas signed his first professional contract with them on 16 September 2016. Aktas made his professional debut for Sochaux in a 1–0 Ligue 2 win over Amiens SC on 9 December 2016, at the age of 17.

On 13 July 2018, Aktas signed a three-year contract with Ligue 1 club Stade de Reims.

On 12 August 2019 he has signed a 3-year contract with Kayserispor of the Turkish Süper Lig.

International career
Aktas was born in France and is of Turkish descent. A youth international for France, Aktas scored in the first minute in his first international appearance with the France U16s in a friendly 3-0 win over the Morocco U16s.

Aktas was called up to represent the Turkey U19s at the 2018 UEFA European Under-19 Championship. He debuted for the Turkey U19s in a friendly 2-0 loss to the Finland U19s on 5 July 2018.

References

External links
 
 
 
 

1999 births
French people of Turkish descent
People from Audincourt
Sportspeople from Doubs
Footballers from Bourgogne-Franche-Comté
Living people
Turkish footballers
Turkey youth international footballers
French footballers
France youth international footballers
Association football midfielders
FC Sochaux-Montbéliard players
Stade de Reims players
Kayserispor footballers
Fatih Karagümrük S.K. footballers
Gençlerbirliği S.K. footballers
Ligue 2 players
Championnat National 2 players
Süper Lig players
TFF First League players